Walter Shenson (June 22, 1919 – October 17, 2000) was a film producer, director and writer, best known for producing the Beatles' films A Hard Day's Night (1964) and Help! (1965), as well as the 1959 comedy The Mouse That Roared, starring Peter Sellers.

He was born in San Francisco, California in 1919 and attended Stanford University. He also spent two years in the United States Army during World War II. His wife, Geraldine, died in 1999. Shenson also had a sister, two sons and four grandchildren.

References 

1919 births
2000 deaths
American film producers
American male screenwriters
Stanford University alumni
Film producers from California
20th-century American businesspeople
Film directors from San Francisco
Screenwriters from California
20th-century American male writers
20th-century American screenwriters
United States Army personnel of World War II